Ysaires Restituyo is a female beach volleyball player from Dominican Republic, who played in the NORCECA Beach Volleyball Circuit 2007 with Cinthia Piñeiro, 2008, with Ingrid Carmona and 2009 with Ana Ligia Fabian; at Santo Domingo, Dominican Republic.

References

 

Year of birth missing (living people)
Living people
Dominican Republic beach volleyball players
Women's beach volleyball players